Sir Thomas Barnardiston, 1st Baronet (died 14 October 1669) was an English baronet, landowner, soldier and MP who sat in the House of Commons at various times between 1640 and 1659. He fought on the Parliamentary side in the English Civil War.

Barnardiston was the son of Sir Nathaniel Barnardiston of Kedington ("Ketton"), Suffolk and his wife Jane, daughter of Sir Stephen Soame, Lord Mayor of London. His brother was Sir Samuel Barnardiston, 1st Bart. of Brightwell, Suffolk. He matriculated from St Catharine's College, Cambridge in Autumn 1633 and was admitted at Gray's Inn on 1 May 1635.
 
Barnardiston was knighted in 1641 but fought on the side of parliament in the Civil War. In 1645, he was elected Member of Parliament for Bury St. Edmunds in the Long Parliament and survived Pride's Purge. In 1654 he was elected one of the MPs for Suffolk for the First Protectorate Parliament and in 1656 in the Second Protectorate Parliament. He was re-elected in 1659 for the Third Protectorate Parliament and reattended as a member for Bury St Edmunds in the Restored Rump Parliament in 1659.
 
Barnardiston married Anne Airmine, daughter of Sir William Airmine, 1st Baronet of Osgodby in South Kesteven, Lincolnshire. He supported the Restoration of the Monarchy, and was created 1st Baronet of Ketton by King Charles II on 7 April 1663. He died in 1669 and was buried at Kedington. He was succeeded by his son Sir Thomas (1646-1698). His daughter Anne became the second wife of the traveller Sir Philip Skippon (1641-1691) of Wrentham and Edwardstone in Suffolk.

References

 

Year of birth missing
1669 deaths
Baronets in the Baronetage of England
Roundheads
English MPs 1640–1648
English MPs 1648–1653
English MPs 1654–1655
English MPs 1656–1658
English MPs 1659
Thomas